Namas was an ancient sage (rishi), who was a descendant of Sage Kashyapa.

References 

Dhallapiccola, Anna L (2002). Dictionary of Hindu Lore and Legend..

Mythology
Rishis